During the 1998–99 season, Tottenham Hotspur participated in the English Premier League.

Season summary
A dismal start to the season saw Christian Gross lose his job as Tottenham manager less than a year after taking over. There were a few raised eyebrows when the job went to George Graham – who had achieved so much success during his reign at Tottenham's deadly rivals Arsenal. But the appointment brought instant success: though Tottenham were unable to progress beyond 11th place in the final Premiership table, they triumphed in the Worthington Cup (while also reaching the FA Cup semi-final) to attain only their second European campaign of the post-Heysel era.

Final league table

Results summary

Results by matchday

Results
Tottenham Hotspur's score comes first

Legend

FA Premier League

FA Cup

League Cup

First-team squad
Squad at end of season

Left club during season

Reserve squad

Statistics

Appearances and goals

|-
! colspan=14 style=background:#dcdcdc; text-align:center| Goalkeepers

|-
! colspan=14 style=background:#dcdcdc; text-align:center| Defenders

|-
! colspan=14 style=background:#dcdcdc; text-align:center| Midfielders

|-
! colspan=14 style=background:#dcdcdc; text-align:center| Forwards

|-
! colspan=14 style=background:#dcdcdc; text-align:center| Players transferred out during the season

Goal scorers 

The list is sorted by shirt number when total goals are equal.

Clean sheets

Transfers

In

Out

Transfers in:  £9,375,000
Transfers out:  £315,000
Total spending:  £9,060,000

References

Tottenham Hotspur F.C. seasons
Tottenham Hotspur